Methylethyl ketone oxime is the organic compound with the formula C2H5C(NOH)CH3.  This colourless liquid is the oxime derivative of methyl ethyl ketone.  MEKO, as it is called in the paint industry, is used to suppress "skinning" of paints: the formation of a skin on paint before it is used. It is particularly used in alkyd paints. MEKO functions by binding the drying agents, metal salts that catalyze the oxidative crosslinking of drying oils.  Once the paint is applied to a surface, MEKO evaporates, thereby allowing the drying process to proceed.  Other antiskinning agents have been used, including phenolic antioxidants (E.G butylated hydroxytoluene), but these tend to yellow the paint. This oxime is also used in some types of RTV silicones.

References

Ketoximes
Visual arts materials
Painting materials